Aesthetica Magazine is an international art and culture magazine, founded in 2002. Published bi-monthly, it covers contemporary art from around the world, across visual arts, photography, architecture, fashion, and design. It has a readership of over 500,000 with national and international distribution.

Aesthetica also produces several awards, exhibitions, and events in art, photography, literature, and film. They consist of the BAFTA-Qualifying  Aesthetica Film Festival, the Future Now Symposium, Art Prize and Creative Writing Award.

Cherie Federico, Managing Director and Editor of Aesthetica, was appointed a Fellow of the Royal Society of Arts in 2008. She was also awarded an Honorary Doctorate from London College of Communication, University of the Arts London, in June 2019.

History
Aesthetica was founded by Cherie Federico and Dale Donley, when they were students at York St John University, in 2002.

In 2003, the magazine received distribution at Borders. In 2007, the magazine began to be stocked in WHSmith high-street stores and major galleries including the ICA, Tate and National Portrait Gallery in London, Arnolfini in Bristol, and the Centre for Contemporary Arts in Glasgow. In 2009, Aesthetica significantly increased its distribution network and is now stocked at major airports and train stations nationwide, department stores such as Selfridges and Harrods, and is exported to over 20 countries worldwide.

Content
Aesthetica includes features on art, design, architecture, fashion, film, and music, highlighting notable new exhibitions around the world and showcasing contemporary photography, from emerging to established practitioners. The publication covers work by leading artists such as Steve McQueen, Martin Creed, Ai Weiwei, Jenny Holzer, Alex Prager, Stephen Shore, Joel Meyerowitz, Cindy Sherman, Vivianne Sassen, amongst others.

Articles have explored subjects such as the intersection between art and politics, the marriage of fashion and technology, contemporary minimalist design, and architectural innovation.

Photography
A large section of the magazine is dedicated to photography and has featured photo essays from artists such as Richard Tuschman and Stephen Shore. It has also published the photography of Julia Fullerton-Batten, Maia Flore, Carolina Mizrahi, Formento & Formento, Ryan Schude, Natalia Evelyn Bencicova, Maria Svarbova, Brad Walls, Kevin Cooley, Emily Shur, Miles Aldridge, and Michael Wolf. Recent cover photographers include creative duos Sally Ann & Emily May, JUCO, Yossi Michaeli, Eugenio Recuenco, Daniel Korzewa, Jacques Olivar, and Jimmy Marble.

Exhibitions
Aesthetica covers the latest exhibitions opening around the world at major art institutions. Previous editorial features have covered Hello, my name is Paul Smith at the Design Museum, London; What is Luxury? at the V&A, London; the Future of Fashion is Now at the Museum Boijmans Van Beuningen, Rotterdam; Frank Gehry's retrospective at Centre Pompidou; Mona Hatoum's retrospective at Tate Modern; a collection of Pierre Paulin's designs at Centre Pompidou; Jenny Holzer's site-specific commission at MASS MoCA; Anthony McCall at The Hepworth, Ai Weiwei at Yorkshire Sculpture Park; Gregory Crewdson at The Photographers' Gallery; and The Future Starts Here at the V&A and Björk Digital at Somerset House.

Architecture 
With urban development, sustainability, geopolitics and adaptability as core interests for the architecture features, previous articles have included coverage on Frank Gehry, Venice Biennale, Bernard Tschumi, the Chicago Architecture Biennale, the Serpentine Pavilions and the RIBA Stirling Prize.

Design 
Aesthetica often publishes features on design, considering social spaces, domestic solutions and 21st century practices. Previous features have provided coverage on the London Design Biennale, the Shanghai Expo, the Stockholm Furniture and Light Fair and Surface Design Show, as well as articles based on new releases from Prestel Publishing and Thames and Hudson.

Fashion 
Names and institutions that have been featured include designers from London Fashion Week, Iris van Herpen, Viktor & Rolf, Pauline van Dongen, Crafting Plastics!, and The Metropolitan Museum of Art.

Film
The film section in Aesthetica reviews and explores new films, with a focus on works of artistic merit. Films covered include works by Alice Lowe, Ben Wheatley, Richard Ayoade, Atiq Rahimi, and Michel Gondry. Films reviewed by Aesthetica include BAFTA winning Ida by Pawel Pawlikowski, BAFTA-nominated ‘71 by Yann Demange and Iain Forsyth and Jane Pollard's 20,000 Days on Earth following the life of Nick Cave, which won the Editing Award and the Directing Award at Sundance in the World Cinema Documentary category. The film section also often explores film festivals and interviews festival programmers, cinematographers, directors, writers, and more.

Music
Topics covered include manipulating found sounds, creating music from video games, the rise of YouTube, and the evolution of the music video. Other subjects include opera, dance music, instrument design, musical comedy, production, and packaging as well as interviews with award-winning musicians such as Alt-J, CHVRCHES, Chelsea Wolfe, and Anna of the North.

Last Words
At the end of each magazine is the section Last Words, which features work and a statement by a prominent artist. Previous artists include Cornelia Parker, Julio Le Parc, Marie Hald, Chiharu Shiota and Do Ho Suh.

Artists' Directory
Aesthetica also offers the Artists' Directory network for both emerging and established practitioners. This provides an opportunity for artists to connect with art collectors and gallerists.

Awards

Aesthetica Short Film Festival 
The Aesthetica Short Film Festival (ASFF) is an international film festival which takes place annually in York, England, at the beginning of November. Founded in 2011, it's a celebration of independent film from around the world, and an outlet for supporting and championing filmmaking. The programme includes over 400 films screenings and 100 events, such as masterclasses, networking sessions, panel discussions and the UK's first Industry Marketplace, making ASFF is one of the UK's key film festivals.

ASFF is also a BAFTA- and BIFA- Qualifying festival, meaning short films that are screened may be eligible for these awards.

The festival opens for entries on 1 December and closes on 31 May. ASFF welcomes submissions from emerging and established practitioners, accepting short films across a range of genres including; Advertising, Animation, Artists’ Film, Comedy, Documentary, Drama, Experimental, Fashion, Music Video and Thriller. Since 2018, ASFF has also accepted Feature Film entries over 60 minutes, as well as Virtual Reality & Immersive projects.

Official Selection 
All films in the Official Selection are in competition to receive a number of awards. These awards recognise outstanding talent in filmmaking practice. The winning films are selected by a jury of industry experts, and are presented at the Closing Night Awards Ceremony.

Industry Marketplace 
The Industry Marketplace is the first event of its kind in the UK. The event is a platform for attendees and delegates to engage with key organisations from across the sector, including international film festivals, screen agencies, sales agents, global distributors and renowned universities. Over 40 exhibitors were included, from BFI NETWORK, Locarno Film Festival, Creative England, to Edinburgh Film Festival, Sheffield Doc/Fest, Hijack Post, London College of Communication and Festival Formula.

Aesthetica Art Prize
The Aesthetica Art Prize is an annual award celebrating the world's best contemporary artists through exhibition and publication. Two prizes are awarded: Main and Emerging. The exhibition has taken place at York Art Gallery since 2017, and has exhibited works from today’s leading practitioners including Magnum photographers, Turner Prize-nominees, RSA Film directors, World Press Photo winners and Prix Pictet nominees. The Prize attracts thousands of entries each year from across the globe, from countries including Australia, Belgium, China, France, Germany, Italy, Japan, Mexico, Norway, Singapore, the UK and the USA. The judging panel has included representatives from BALTIC, Frieze, V&A, Guggenheim, British Council, Brooklyn Museum and FACT Liverpool.

Entries open in January and close on 31 August. The £10,000 Prize welcomes submissions across: Photographic and Digital Art; Three Dimensional Design and Sculpture; Painting, Drawing and Mixed-Media, and Video, Installation and Performance.

The 15th edition of the Aesthetica Art Prize Exhibition opened on 23 June 2022, and winners were announced from a shortlist of 20 artists. The Main Prize Winner was Baff Akoto, and the Emerging Prize Winner was Yukako Tanaka. Other finalists included Steve Messam, who created a site-specific inflatable installation on the York Art Gallery portico spanning 15 metres.

Aesthetica Future Now Symposium 
The Future Now Symposium is a two-day annual event. It brings together key art institutions, galleries and publications for discussion surrounding pressing issues from the creative industries. Through imaginative debates, career advice and cultural engagement, Future Now describes itself as a platform for idea generation.

Originally launched in 2016, Future Now sessions are led by artists, curators, academics and representatives from major cultural institutions in the UK such as Tate, Art Fund, Arts Council England, Whitechapel Gallery, Royal College of Art, Frieze, V&A, Getty Images Gallery, The Art Newspaper, Foam Amsterdam, RIBA, Magnum Photos, London Art Fair, The Design Museum, Serpentine Galleries, BALTIC, Creative Review, Photo London, Design Museum, Glasgow School of Art,  MoMA, High Museum of Art, Fondazione Prada, Gagosian, International Center of Photography, ICA Boston and British Council. Future Now's sixth edition was hosted completely online.

Topics have included: Arts Journalism is the Digital Age; How to Get Ahead as an Emerging Artist; Talent Development and Art Prizes; The Changing Face of the Art Institution; Environmental Photography: How Can Images Save Us?; Curating During a Time of Change; Documentary & Ethics: When is it Your Story to Tell?; Digital Ecologies: Three-Dimensional Storytelling; The Business of Art: The Future of Collecting; Decolonising the Art World; and Deep Fakes: Control and Subversion in Art. Speakers have included renowned UK documentary photographer Martin Parr, Cornelia Parker (OBE, RA), Shirin Neshat, Athi-Patra Ruga, Bieke Depoorter, Turner Prize nominees Jane & Louise Wilson, Prix Pictet-winning artist and director Nadav Kander and Official War Artist John Keane.

The seventh edition of the Future Now Symposium took place in person and via live stream from 5–6 May 2022. It featured topics such as How to Fund Your Practice; Who Controls History?; and The Power of Discomfort: Art That Shatters Stereotypes. Through the lens of art and culture, the programme dissected who, and what, is being represented in galleries today, amidst humanity's changing relationship with nature and technology. Featured speakers included Sutapa Biswas, Daisy Ginsberg, Larry Achiampong, Poulomi Basu, Hannah Starkey and Jamie Hawkesworth, as well as galleries including Barbican Centre and Hayward Gallery.

Aesthetica Creative Writing Award
The Aesthetica Creative Writing Award is an international literary prize for established and emerging poets and writers. Shortlisted entries are published annually in the Aesthetica Creative Writing Award Anthology; whilst category winners receive a share of £5,000 prize money.

Call for entries open in January and close on 31 August, accepting entries across Poetry and Short Fiction.

References

External links 

2002 establishments in the United Kingdom
Visual arts magazines published in the United Kingdom
Bi-monthly magazines published in the United Kingdom
Magazines established in 2002
Mass media in York